Strastnoy Boulevard is a major boulevard in Moscow. It begins in the Tverskoy District by Pushkin Square, Tverskaya Street and Tverskoy Boulevard. The boulevard ends at Petrovka Street, although east of Petrovka, it becomes Petrovsky Boulevard, where it heads to Clean Ponds. The Strastnoy Boulevard is a part of the Boulevard Ring.

Gallery 

Boulevards in Moscow
Cultural heritage monuments of regional significance in Moscow